The Two Thumb Range (sometimes called the Two Thumbs Range) is a range of mountains in the Canterbury Region of New Zealand's South Island. The southern end of the range contains one of Canterbury's main skifields, Mount Dobson.

Geography
The two ranges are separated by the valley of the Macauley River and form a barrier between the valleys of the Godley River and Lake Tekapo to the west and the Rangitata River to the east. The Two Thumb Range's peaks diminish in size towards its southern end, immediately to the east of the town of Lake Tekapo, after which it splits into two less significant ranges, the Rollesby and Albury ranges. At the saddle between the Two Thumb Range and these ranges, State Highway 8 crosses Burkes Pass on its route between Lake Tekapo and Fairlie. 

The South Opuha, Havelock, and Coal Rivers have their sources within the Two Thumb Range, as do numerous smaller watercourses, the most notable of which is Forest Creek, a tributary of the Rangitata River.

Peaks
Major peaks within the range include (from north to south): 
Mount D'Archaic — 
Mount Alma — 
Mount Achilles — 
Mount Myrmidon — 
The Thumbs — 
Captains Peak — 
Mount Hope — 
Mount Misery — 
Dobson Peak — 

The names of several of the range's peaks, including Mount Achilles and Mount Graf Spee, commemorate New Zealand's involvement in the Battle of the River Plate.

Recreation
Dobson Peak and its surrounding terrain are the home of the Mount Dobson skifield. The smaller Roundhill Ski Area is also located within the range.

New Zealand's major north-to-south walking track, Te Araroa Trail, crosses the Rangitata River before following the valley of a tributary, Bush Stream, into the Two Thumb Range. It crosses the range at Stag Saddle — the trail's highest point at  — immediately to the north of Mount Hope, before following the eastern shore of Lake Tekapo south.

In popular culture
The Two Thumb Range was the setting for Desmond Bagley's 1975 novel, The Snow Tiger.

References

Mountain ranges of Canterbury, New Zealand